Hugh XII de Lusignan, Hugh VII of La Marche or Hugh III of Angoulême (c. 1235/1240 – after 25 August 1270). He was the son of Hugh XI of Lusignan and Yolande of Brittany. He succeeded his father as seigneur of Lusignan, Couhé, and Peyrat, Count of La Marche and Count of Angoulême in 1250.

On 29 January 1253/4, at Fougères, he married Jeanne de Fougères (d. aft.1273), daughter of Raoul III, seigneur of Fougères, and Isabelle de Craon. They had six children:

 Hugh XIII of Lusignan
 Guy of Lusignan, Count of Angoulême
 Yolande de Lusignan
 Jeanne of Lusignan, married (1st) Bernard-Ezy I, seigneur of Albret; (2nd) Sir Peter de Geneville, Knt.
 Marie de Lusignan (d. aft. 1312), married in 1288 Etienne II, Count of Sancerre (d. c. 1306)
 Isabelle de Lusignan, married Jean of Vesci.

Death
Hugh XII de Lusignan died in 1270 while on Crusade with King Louis IX of France in an early battle of the Eighth Crusade. His eldest son Hugh XIII de Lusignan succeeded him.

References

Sources

13th-century births
1270 deaths

Year of birth uncertain
Counts of Angoulême
Counts of La Marche
House of Lusignan
13th-century French people
Christians of the Eighth Crusade